CJET-FM (101.1 MHz, CityNews Ottawa) is a commercial radio station licensed to Smiths Falls, Ontario, and serving the National Capital Region including Ottawa. It is owned by Rogers Sports & Media and it simulcasts a News/Talk format with co-owned CIWW. CJET has radio studios in Smiths Falls (as part of its license agreement), with auxiliary studios at the Rogers Ottawa cluster on Thurston Drive and Conroy Road.  

CJET has an effective radiated power (ERP) of 100,000 watts, the current maximum power for Canadian FM stations. The transmitter is on Ontario Highway 15 near Line Route 7 in Beckwith, Ontario.

History
The station was launched at 101.1 MHz on January 20, 1969 as CJET-FM, a sister station to the AM radio station CJET. The station on 101.1 changed its callsign to CKUE in the early 1970s.

In 1984, the stations were acquired by CHEZ-FM Inc., the owner of Ottawa's CHEZ. In 1986, CKUE changed its callsign to CHEQ, and adopted the Q101 brand. Q101 switched from its longtime adult contemporary format to country music in 1990, but the country format was financially unsuccessful.

In 1993, CHEZ acquired rights to the callsign and format of CFMO, an easy listening station in Ottawa which CHUM Limited had converted to hot adult contemporary CKKL.

In 1999, the CHEZ group of stations were acquired by Rogers Media. On December 31 of that year, Rogers converted the station to a modern rock format and moved the station's studios into Ottawa, using the callsign CIOX and the brand name Xfm. However, in 2001 the CRTC found that by operating CIOX as an Ottawa station, Rogers was in contravention of market concentration rules about the number of radio stations in a single market that can be owned by the same company. As a result, the CRTC ordered Rogers to return the station to Smiths Falls.

In October 2003, the station stunted for the day as 101.1 Frank FM, playing pretty much anything.

On January 9, 2004, at Noon, the station adopted its current format when Rogers converted the former CKBY in Ottawa to the current CISS. 101.1 became CKBY-FM Y101, and 105.3 became CISS-FM a month later after the format change. On June 28, 2013, the station was rebranded as Country 101.1 as part of a standardization of Rogers' country stations.

On December 3, 2020, as part of a larger realignment of Rogers' Ottawa stations, the station flipped to news/talk as an FM simulcast of CIWW, with both stations also rebranded as CityNews Ottawa. The country format moved to sister station CJET 92.3, with the stations also swapping call signs.

Programming
On weekdays, local all-news blocks are heard in morning and afternoon drive time. In middays, two local talk shows air: Rob Snow in late mornings and Sam Laprade in early afternoons. Their shows are repeated in the evening. Overnights feature the national all-news service shared with CFTR Toronto, CFFR Calgary and CKWX Vancouver.

On weekends, all-news blocks are heard in the morning and overnight, with talk shows in the afternoon and CBS Sports Radio in the evening. ABC News Radio supplies reports on world and U.S. news. Toronto Blue Jays baseball games are carried. The Blue Jays, CKBY-FM and CIWW are all co-owned by Rogers Communications.

References

External links
 CityNews Ottawa
 CJET-FM history - Canadian Communications Foundation
Smiths Falls Then & Now - CJET
 

Jet
Jet
Jet
Smiths Falls
Jet
Radio stations established in 1955
1955 establishments in Ontario